Franz-Josef 'Pino' Steininger (born July 9, 1960) is a retired German football player.

External links
 

1960 births
Living people
German footballers
MSV Duisburg players
SG Union Solingen players
1. FC Saarbrücken players
Bundesliga players
Association football midfielders